The 1998 Mercedes Cup was a men's tennis tournament played on clay courts at the Tennis Club Weissenhof in Stuttgart, Germany, that was part of the International Series Gold of the 1998 ATP Tour. It was the fiftieth edition of the tournament and was held from 20 July until 26 July. Gustavo Kuerten won the singles title.

Finals

Singles

 Gustavo Kuerten defeated  Karol Kučera, 4–6, 6–2, 6–4.

Doubles

 Olivier Delaître /  Fabrice Santoro defeated  Joshua Eagle /  Jim Grabb, 6–1, 3–6, 6–3.

References

External links
 Official website 
 ITF tournament edition details
 ATP tournament profile

Mercedes Cup
Stuttgart Open
1998 in German tennis